Craighall Sherry (April 8, 1869; Glasgow, Scotland, UK - 1943 (age 73); Uxbridge, Middlesex, UK) was a British stage and film actor.

Selected filmography
 The Battles of Coronel and Falkland Islands (1927)
 Spione (1928)
 Number 17 (1928)
 The Informer (1929)
 The Loves of Robert Burns (1930)
 Nell Gwyn (1934)
 Royal Cavalcade (1935)

Bibliography
 Ott, Frederick W. The Films of Fritz Lang. Citadel Press, 1979.

External links

1869 births
1943 deaths
Scottish male silent film actors
20th-century Scottish male actors
Scottish male stage actors